Neoregelia brownii is a species of plant in the bromeliad family. This species is endemic to southeastern Brazil. The specific epithet honors Gregory K. Brown, a North American botanist and one of the collectors of the species.

References

brownii
Flora of Brazil